Ivan Lenković (died   22 June 1569) was a Habsburg Croatian army general and the leader of the Uskoks. He carried the title of baron. He is noted for the construction of Nehaj Fortress and as a captain of the Senj area. He also contributed in organizing the Military Frontier.

During the Ottoman wars in Europe, Klis Fortress was on 7 April 1569, liberated by Split noblemen Ivan Alberti and Nikola Cindro. Bey Mustafa responded by bringing under Klis Fortress more than 10,000 soldiers. General Ivan Lenković with 1,000 uskoks came in relief, to some 1500 Klis defenders. During the battle, Ivan Lenković withdrew, after he himself was wounded, and the fortress was delivered to the Turks, on 31 May. But this temporary relief resound in Europe, and among the local population. He died in Metlika on 22 June 1569 and is buried in Novo Mesto Franciscan Church.

See also 
Uskoks
Fortress Nehaj
Petar Kružić

References

Footnotes

Bibliography

External links 
Ivan Lenković - baron and general of the Croatian Military Frontier 
Biography 

Croatian soldiers
Croatian nobility
16th-century Croatian nobility
16th-century Croatian military personnel
Barons of Croatia
Year of birth missing
1569 deaths
16th-century Croatian people